Collops bipunctatus, the two-spotted melyrid, is a species of soft-winged flower beetle in the family Melyridae. It is found mainly in North America.

References

External links

 

Melyridae
Beetles described in 1823